Khurram Shehzad  is a Pakistani politician who was a member of the National Assembly of Pakistan from August 2018 until January 2023. Previously he was a Member of the Provincial Assembly of the Punjab, from October 2013 to May 2018.

Early life and education
He was born on 4 April 1962 in Faisalabad.

He graduated from University of the Punjab in 1989.

Political career

He was elected to the Provincial Assembly of the Punjab as a candidate of Pakistan Tehreek-e-Insaf (PTI) from Constituency PP-72 (Faisalabad-XXII) in by polls held in October 2013.

He was elected to the National Assembly of Pakistan as a candidate of PTI from Constituency NA-107 (Faisalabad-VII) in 2018 Pakistani general election. He resigned in January 2023.

References

External Link

More Reading
 List of members of the 15th National Assembly of Pakistan

Living people
1969 births
Pakistan Tehreek-e-Insaf MPAs (Punjab)
Pakistan Tehreek-e-Insaf MNAs
Punjab MPAs 2013–2018
Pakistani MNAs 2018–2023
Politicians from Faisalabad